The 22nd Pennsylvania House of Representatives District is in southeastern Pennsylvania and has been represented by Joshua Siegel since 2023.

District profile
The 22nd District is located within Lehigh County and includes following areas:

 Allentown (part) 
Ward 01 
Ward 04 
Ward 05 
Ward 06 
Ward 07 
Ward 08 (part) 
Division 01 
Division 02 
Division 03 
Division 05 
Division 06 
Ward 09 
Ward 10 
Ward 11 (part) 
Division 02
Ward 14 
Ward 15
Salisbury Township (part)
Ward 01 
Ward 02 
Ward 03 (part) 
Division 02

Representatives

Recent election results

References

External links
District Map from the United States Census Bureau
Pennsylvania House Legislative District Maps from the Pennsylvania Redistricting Commission.  
Population Data for District 22 from the Pennsylvania Redistricting Commission.

Government of Lehigh County, Pennsylvania
22